Timothy Olaoluwa Akinola (born 8 May 2001) is a Nigerian professional footballer who plays as a midfielder for Chesterfield, on loan from Arsenal.

Career
Akinola was born in Lokoja, Nigeria. He played youth football with Lincoln City and Huddersfield Town, before signing for Arsenal in summer 2020. After playing for Arsenal under-23s, he moved on loan to Scottish club Dundee United in January 2022. Akinola initially believed he has signed for the club's city rivals Dundee.

After one 45-minute appearance for Dundee United which saw him substituted at half-time, Akinola returned to Arsenal in March 2022 due to injury. He later underwent surgery. In August 2022, he joined Chesterfield in the National League on a season-long loan, making his debut as a substitute against Oldham Athletic.

References

2001 births
Living people
Sportspeople from Kogi State
Nigerian footballers
Association football midfielders
Lincoln City F.C. players
Huddersfield Town A.F.C. players
Arsenal F.C. players
Dundee United F.C. players
Scottish Professional Football League players
Chesterfield F.C. players
National League (English football) players